This is a list of destinations served and formerly served by easyJet , the operations of which collectively include those of easyJet Europe, easyJet Switzerland, and easyJet UK.

List

Top airports by destinations

See also 
List of EasyJet Switzerland destinations

Notes

External links 
EasyJet

References 

Lists of airline destinations